Mole Valley is a constituency represented in the House of Commons of the UK Parliament since 1997 by Sir Paul Beresford, a Conservative.

Boundaries

1983–1997: The District of Mole Valley, and the Borough of Guildford ward of Tillingbourne.

1997–present: The District of Mole Valley wards of Beare Green, Bookham North, Bookham South, Box Hill and Headley, Brockham, Betchworth and Buckland, Capel, Leigh and Newdigate, Charlwood, Dorking North, Dorking South, Fetcham East, Fetcham West, Holmwoods, Leatherhead North, Leatherhead South, Leith Hill, Mickleham, Westhumble and Pixham, Okewood, and Westcott; and the Borough of Guildford wards of Clandon and Horsley, Effingham, Lovelace, Send, and Tillingbourne.

The constituency is larger than the Mole Valley district in Surrey as it includes five wards in the east of the Borough of Guildford, three of which are nearer to Woking than to Dorking. The largest town in the constituency is Dorking, second largest is Leatherhead and there are many rural and semi-rural villages, generally within one hour's reach of London so properly classed as part of the London Commuter Belt.

History and constituency profile
The constituency was created in 1983; much of the same area was covered by the Dorking constituency which preceded it. It is a Conservative safe seat in terms of length of party tenure and great size of its majorities, It has a majority adult demographic of affluent middle-class families living in commuter towns and villages speedily connected to business parks by road and central London by rail, it was one of a few seats to return a new candidate as Conservative MP who won a majority in excess of 10,000 in the 1997 Labour landslide; the main opposition since 1983 has been the Liberal Democrats and their largest predecessor party, the Liberal Party.

Members of Parliament

Elections

Elections in the 2010s

Elections in the 2000s

Elections in the 1990s
This constituency underwent boundary changes between the 1992 and 1997 general elections and thus change in share of vote is based on a notional calculation.

Elections in the 1980s

See also
List of parliamentary constituencies in Surrey

Notes

References

Bibliography
Election result, 2017 & 2015 (BBC)
Election result, 2010 (BBC)
Election result, 2005 (BBC)
Election results, 1997 - 2001 (BBC)
Election results, 1997 - 2001  (Election Demon)
Election results, 1983 - 1992 (Election Demon)
Election results, 1992 - 2010 (Guardian)
Election result, 2010 (UKPollingReport)

Parliamentary constituencies in South East England
Politics of Surrey
Constituencies of the Parliament of the United Kingdom established in 1983
Mole Valley